The 1945 Soviet football championship was the 13th season of competitive football in the Soviet Union and the 7th featuring teams hailing from sports societies and factories. It also was the first full season with league competitions after World War II. The tiers were renamed after World War II, with Group A being renamed to First Group and Group B renamed to Second Group. FC Dynamo Moscow won the championship, becoming the Soviet domestic champions for the fourth time.

Honours

Notes = Number in parentheses is the times that club has won that honour. * indicates new record for competition

Soviet Union football championship

First Group

Second Group

Top goalscorers

1st Group
Vsevolod Bobrov (CSKA Moscow) – 24 goals

2nd Group
Sergei Zaikin (Torpedo Gorkiy) – 11 goals

Republican level
Football competitions of union republics

Football championships
 Azerbaijan SSR – Neftianik Baku
 Armenian SSR – Spartak Yerevan
 Belarusian SSR – Dynamo-2 Minsk (see Football Championship of the Belarusian SSR)
 Estonian SSR – Dynamo Tallin
 Georgian SSR – Lokomotiv Tbilisi
 Kazakh SSR – none
 Karelo-Finish SSR – unknown
 Kirgiz SSR – Dynamo Frunze
 Latvian SSR – Dynamo Riga
 Lithuanian SSR – Spartak Kaunas
 Moldavian SSR – Dynamo Kishinev
 Russian SFSR – none
 Tajik SSR – none
 Turkmen SSR – none
 Uzbek SSR – none
 Ukrainian SSR – none (see Football Championship of the Ukrainian SSR)

Football cups
 Azerbaijan SSR – Neftianik Baku
 Armenian SSR – Dynamo Yerevan
 Belarusian SSR – ODO Minsk
 Estonian SSR – none
 Georgian SSR – Lokomotiv Tbilisi
 Kazakh SSR – none
 Karelo-Finish SSR – unknown
 Kirgiz SSR – none
 Latvian SSR – none
 Lithuanian SSR – none
 Moldavian SSR – Dynamo Kishinev
 Russian SFSR – none
 Tajik SSR – none
 Turkmen SSR – Dynamo Ashkhabad
 Uzbek SSR – none
 Ukrainian SSR – FC Lokomotyv Kharkiv (see 1945 Cup of the Ukrainian SSR)

References

External links
 1945 Soviet football championship. RSSSF